Aquabacter  is an oxidase and catalase-positive genus of bacteria from the family of Hyphomicrobiaceae.  It contains only the single species A. spiritensis.

References

 

Hyphomicrobiales
Monotypic bacteria genera
Bacteria genera